Kerch (Old East Slavic: Кърчевъ; Ancient Greek: , Pantikápaion; Medieval Greek:  Bosporos;) is a city of regional significance on the Kerch Peninsula in the east of Crimea. Kerch has a population of about 

Founded 2,600 years ago as an ancient Greek colony, Kerch is considered to be one of the most ancient cities in Crimea. The city experienced rapid growth starting in the 1920s and was the site of a major battle during World War II.

Today, it is one of the largest cities in Crimea and is among the republic's most important industrial, transport and tourist centres.

History

Ancient times

Archeological digs at Mayak village near the city ascertained that the area had already been inhabited in the 17th–15th centuries BC. While many finds from Kerch can be found in the Hermitage Museum in St Petersburg and the local museum, a large number of antique sculptures, reliefs, bronze and glassware, ceramics and jewellery were excavated in 1855-1856 during the Crimean War by Doctor Duncan MacPherson, a surgeon from the British Army, and later donated to the British Museum in London.

Kerch as a city starts its history in the 7th century BC, when Greek colonists from Miletus founded a city-state named Panticapaeum on Mount Mithridat near the mouth of the Melek-Chesme river. Panticapaeum subdued nearby cities and by 480 BC became the capital of the Kingdom of Bosporus. Later, during the rule of Mithradates VI Eupator, Panticapaeum for a short period of time became the capital of the much more powerful and extensive Kingdom of Pontus.
The city was located at the intersection of trade routes between the steppe and Europe. This caused it to grow rapidly. The city's main exports were grain and salted fish; wine-making was also common. Panticapaeum minted its own coins. According to extant documents the Melek-Chesme river (small and shallow nowadays) was navigable in Bosporan times, and sea galleys were able to enter the river. A large portion of the city's population was ethnically Scythian, later Sarmatian, as the large royal barrow (Kurgan) at Kul-Oba testifies.

In the 1st century AD Panticapaeum and the Kingdom of Bosporus suffered from Ostrogoth raids; then the city was devastated by the Huns in AD 375.

Myrmekion was founded in the eastern part of the Kerch, 4 km NE of ancient Panticapaeum. The settlement was founded by Ionians in the first half of the 6th c. BC.

Middle Ages 

From the 6th century the city was under the control of the Byzantine Empire. By order of Emperor Justinian I, a citadel named Bospor was built there. Bospor was the centre of a bishopric, the diocese of Bosporus and developed under the influence of Greek Christianity. In 576, it withstood a siege by the Göktürks under Bokhan, aided by Anagai, the last khan (ruler) of the Uturgurs (tribe of Huns).

In the 7th century, the Turkic Khazars took control of Bospor, and the city was named Karcha from Turkic "karşı" meaning 'opposite, facing.' The main local government official during Khazar times was the tudun. Christianity was a major religion in Kerch during the period of Khazar rule. Kerch's Church of St. John the Baptist was founded in 717; thus, it is the oldest church in Ukraine.  The "Church of the Apostles" existed during the late 8th and early 9th centuries, according to the "Life of the Apostle Andrew" by Epiphanius of Salamis.

Following the fall of Khazaria to Kievan Rus' in the late 10th century, Kerch became the centre of a Khazar successor-state. Its ruler, Georgius Tzul, was deposed by a Byzantine-Rus expedition in 1016.

From the 10th century, the city was a Slavic settlement named Korchev, which belonged to the Tmutarakan principality. Kerch was a center of trade between Russia', Crimea, Caucasus and the Orient.

In the 13th century, Crimea including Korchev was invaded by Mongols. After the Mongols, the city became the Genoese colony of Cerco (Cherkio) in 1318 and served as a sea harbour, where townspeople worked at salt works and fishery.

In 1475, the city was passed to the Ottoman Empire. During the Turkish rule Kerch fell into decay and served as a slave-market. It repeatedly suffered from raids of Zaporizhian Cossacks.

18th–20th centuries

In response to the strengthening of Russian military forces in Azov area, the Turks built a fortress, named Yenikale, near Kerch on the shore of Kerch Strait. The fortress was completed by 1706. In 1771 the Imperial Russian Army invaded Crimea and approached Yenikale. The Turks decided to abandon the fortress, though reinforcements from the Ottoman Empire had arrived a few days earlier. By the Peace Treaty of Kuchuk-Kainarji in 1774, Kerch and Yenikale were ceded to Russia. As a result, the Turkish heritage has been almost completely wiped out.

In 1790 Russian naval forces under the command of admiral Fyodor Ushakov defeated the Turkish fleet at the Battle of Kerch Strait.

Because of its location, from 1821 Kerch developed into an important trade and fishing port. The state museum of ancient times and a number of educational institutions were opened in the city. The ironwork factory was built in 1846 based on a huge iron ore deposit found on Kerch Peninsula.

During the Crimean War the city was devastated by British forces in 1855.

In the late 19th century, mechanical and cement factories were built, and tinned food and tobacco factories were established. By 1900, Kerch was connected to a railroad system, and the fairway of Kerch Strait was deepened and widened. At this time, the population had reached 33,000.

After suffering a decline during the First World War and the Russian Civil War, the city resumed its growth in the late 1920s, with the expansion of various industries, iron ore and metallurgy in particular, and by 1939 its population had reached 104,500.

Kerch in World War II

On the Eastern Front of World War II from 1941 to 1945, Kerch was the site of heavy fighting between Red Army and Axis forces. After fierce fighting, the city was taken by the Germans in November 1941. On 31 December 1941, the 302nd Mountain Rifle Division recaptured the city following a naval landing operation at Kamysh Burun, to the south of the city, five days earlier. In 1942 the Germans occupied the city again. The Red Army lost over 160,000 men, either killed or taken POW at the Battle of the Kerch Peninsula. On 31 October 1943 another Soviet naval landing operation was launched. Kerch returned to Soviet control on 11 April 1944.

The German invaders killed about 15,000 citizens and deported another 14,000 during their occupation. Evidence of German atrocities in Kerch was presented in the Nuremberg trials. After the war, the city was awarded the title Hero City.

The Adzhimushkay catacombs in the city's suburbs were the site of guerrilla warfare against the occupation. Thousands of soldiers and refugees found shelter inside and were involved in counterattacks. Many of them died underground, including those who died of numerous alleged poison gas attacks. Later, a memorial was established on the site.

On 11 November 2007, a powerful storm passed through the city, causing much damage and an ecological disaster as a few ships, including an oil tanker, were shipwrecked and blocked the Kerch Strait.

Recent events

On 17 October 2018, a student killed 20 people and himself at Kerch Polytechnic College.

Geography

Climate
Kerch has a humid subtropical climate (Köppen climate classification Cfa) with cool to cold winters and warm to hot summers.

Administration
The city municipality stretches over a substantial area and includes several separate neighborhoods that are part of the Kerch city: Eltigen (Heroyevskoe), Kamysh-Burun (Arshyntsevo), Port Krym, Adzhimushkai, and Tuzla Island.

Economy
Today Kerch is considered as a city of metallurgists, shipbuilders and fishermen, and also has a significant tourism sector.

Industry
The largest enterprises in the city are:
 Kerch Metallurgical Works Factory launched in 1900
 Kamysh-Burun Iron Ore Plant
 "Zaliv" ("Gulf") shipbuilding factory that produces and repairs tankers and cargo ships.
Construction-materials, food processing, and light industries play a significant role in the city's economy. Kerch is also a fishing fleet base and an important processing centre for numerous fish products.

 Kerch Aircraft Repair Plant KeARZ
 KMZ KMK Metallurgical Plant, Kerch east
 Oil and Gas extraction industry petrochemical and storage
 Zaliv Shipyard, (Kamysh Burun Zheleznogoroda)
 Kvartz Quartz Glass Factory Plant KSZ (Glass (various) and optics, optical materials and instruments) (Kerch)
 PSZ Albatros, PSZ KMPZ Vityaz Priladobudivni (Instruments and Instruments making, Machinery, Engineering)
 Kamysh Burun Iron Metallurgy Plant
 KMZ KMTP SV Fregat floating docks yard and ship repair yard
 KSRZ uvas-trans floating docks yards and ship repair (also lesser Kerch ship repair yards around)

Tourism

Because of its location on the shores of the Azov and Black seas, Kerch became a popular summer resort among people of the former USSR. Also, several mud-cure sources are located near the city. Despite the seaside location, the tourist appeal of Kerch today is limited because of the industrial character of the city and associated pollution.
Despite the lack of beaches in the town's area, there are a lot of them at a distance of 20 minutes' travel by bus, train or taxi.

Kerch has a number of impressive architectural and historical monuments. Ancient historical heritage of the city makes it attractive for scientific tourism. The most notable of Kerch's sights are:
Site of ancient settlement Pantikapaeum (5th century BC–3rd century AD).
Tsarskiy Kurghan (4th century BC) – burial mound for one of the Bosporian kings
Church of St. John the Baptist (AD 717)
Fortress of Yenikale (18th century)
The Great Mithridates Staircase leading on top of the Mount Mithridat, contains 428 footsteps, built in 1833–1840 under the guidance of Italian architect Alexander Digbi
Obelisk of Glory on the Mount Mithridat, built after World War II
Lapidarium
Memorial of heroic guerilla warfare in Adzhimushkay mines
Kerch Fortress; restricted area in Soviet times but free to enter in present days. The fortress was built by the Russian military architect Totleben in the middle of 19th century.
 Sites of ancient settlements Mirmecium, Tiritaka and Nimphei. There are also some settlements which have gone underwater due to earthquakes.
 So called Demetra's Crypt, a crypt with numerous frescos dated 1st century BC.

Transport

Kerch has a harbour on the Kerch Strait, which makes it a key to the Sea of Azov, several railroad terminals and a small airport. The Kerch Strait ferry line across the Kerch Strait was established in 1953, connecting Crimea and the Krasnodar Krai (Port Krym – Port Kavkaz line); (as of November 2009) there are also plans for a Kerch-Poti ferry route.
Tavrida Highway work in progress along Kerch railway (two rails) highway (four lanes) bridge to connect Rostov Krasnodar with peninsula.

There are several ports in Kerch, including Kerch Maritime Trading Port, Kerch Maritime Fishing Port, Port Krym (ferry crossing), Kamysh-Burun Port.

The railroad terminals include: Kerch, Kerch I, Kerch Factory, Arshyntsevo, and Krym.

Bus network connects Kerch to other cities in Crimea and Krasnodar Krai.

City transport 

Kerch has short tram system established in 1935 and destroyed in 1941.

Kerch trolleybus system established in 2004, and have one line.

Crimean Bridge

On 25 April 2010, Ukrainian President Viktor Yanukovych and Russian President Dmitry Medvedev signed an agreement to build a bridge across the Kerch Strait. In January 2015, with Russia now in control, the contract for the construction of the bridge was awarded to Arkady Rotenberg's S.G.M. Group. In May 2015 construction commenced, and the road section of the bridge was opened to traffic in May 2018. The rail section was opened in 2019, with Russian President Vladimir Putin taking the first train across on December 23. It was heavily damaged by an explosion on 8 October 2022.

Culture

Festivals and celebrations
Liberation Day (11 April)
Day of Fishermen (the second Sunday of July)

Education

Kerch hosts (2004):
28 schools,
9 institutes and branches of Ukrainian and Russian universities,
shipbuilding and polytechnical colleges,
medical school,
6 PTU schools,
a number of pre-school child institutions

Archaeology

Archaeological digs in Kerch were launched under Russian auspices in the middle of the 19th century. Since then the site of ancient Panticapaeum city on Mount Mithridat has been systematically excavated. Located nearby are several ancient burial mounds (kurgans) and excavated cities. Kerch takes part in UNESCO's "Silk Road" programme.
Treasures and historical findings of Kerch adorn the collections of major museums around the world. Such as: the Hermitage, the Louvre, the British Museum, the Berlin Museum, the Moscow State Museum of fine arts and many others.
Currently, excavations at ancient fortresses of Kerch are led by scientists from Russia, Ukraine, and Poland.

Twin towns – sister cities

Honours
A minor planet 2216 Kerch discovered in 1971 by Soviet astronomer Tamara Mikhailovna Smirnova is named after the city.

Gallery

See also

 Bosporan Kingdom
 Kerch (fortress)
 Kerch Polytechnic College massacre
 Kerch Strait
 Mount Mithridat
 Panticapaeum
 Tuzla Island
 Yeni-Kale

References

External links

Моя Керчь multi portal My Kerch: news, photo gallery, announcements, etc.
Керчь – это город interactive map of Kerch
Керчь – это мой город unofficial website of Kerch: information, news, photos, forum etc. 
Webcams
 
Photos of Kerch  from Panoramio
Map of Kerch's Center (by "Kartografia", 2004)
Infos and photos of Kerch in travelguide around Ukraine
The murder of the Jews of Kerch during World War II, at Yad Vashem website.

 
Cities in Crimea
Kerch Peninsula
Port cities and towns in Ukraine
Seaside resorts in Ukraine
Taurida Governorate
Archaeological sites in Ukraine
Populated coastal places in Ukraine
Seaside resorts in Russia
Populated coastal places in Russia
Khazar towns
Territories of the Republic of Genoa
Port cities of the Black Sea
Port cities and towns of the Azov Sea
Cities of regional significance in Ukraine
Holocaust locations in Ukraine
Holocaust locations in Russia